Milton J. Barney (born December 23, 1963) is a former American football wide receiver who played one season with the Atlanta Falcons of the National Football League. He played college football at Alcorn State University and attended Gulfport High School in Gulfport, Mississippi. He was also a member of the New Orleans Night of the Arena Football League. In 1991, he was the AFL Ironman of the Year and also named First-team All-Arena.

References

External links
Just Sports Stats
Pro-Football-Reference.com
databaseFootball.com

Living people
1963 births
Place of birth missing (living people)
Players of American football from Mississippi
American football wide receivers
American football defensive backs
African-American players of American football
Alcorn State Braves football players
Atlanta Falcons players
New Orleans Night players
Sportspeople from Gulfport, Mississippi
National Football League replacement players
21st-century African-American people
20th-century African-American sportspeople